James Baines may refer to:

James Baines (clipper), a 1854 passenger clipper ship
James Baines & Co., parent company of a fleet of packet ships running between Liverpool, England and Australia
SS James Baines
James Baines (merchant) (1822–1889), British merchant, shipowner and shipbroker

See also
James Baine (1710–1790), minister of the Church of Scotland
James Baynes (1766–1837), English watercolour painter and drawing-master
James Bain (disambiguation)